Tretyeva is a rural locality (a village) in Beloyevskoye Rural Settlement, Kudymkarsky District, Perm Krai, Russia. The population was 10 as of 2010.

Geography 
Tretyeva is located 31 km northwest of Kudymkar (the district's administrative centre) by road. Perkova is the nearest rural locality.

References 

Rural localities in Kudymkarsky District